López de Micay is a town and municipality in the Cauca Department, Colombia.
It is one of the wettest places on the Earth, with at least some amount of rain falling almost every day, with frequent downpours and torrential rain that causes flash flooding.

Climate 
López de Micay has an extremely wet tropical rainforest climate (Köppen Af).

References

Municipalities of Cauca Department